Ruxandra is a Romanian feminine given name of Persian origin, and a variant of Roxana. Notable bearers of the name include:

 Ruxandra Cesereanu (born 1963), Romanian poet and writer
 Ruxandra Donose (born 1964), Romanian opera singer
 Ruxandra Dragomir (born 1972), Romanian tennis player
 Ruxandra Dumitrescu (born 1977), Romanian volleyball player 
 Ruxandra Hociotă (born 1959), Romanian diver
 Ruxandra Lăpușneanu (1538–1570), princess consort of Moldavia 
 Ruxandra Nedelcu (born 1984), Romanian freestyle skier
 Ruxandra Popa (born 1987), Romanian model and beauty queen
 Ruxandra Porojnicu (born 1993), Romanian actress
 Ruxandra Sireteanu (1945–2008), Romanian biophysicist and neuroscientist

References

Romanian feminine given names